True Romance is the only album by Golden Silvers. It was released by XL Recordings on April 20, 2009 on CD, download and 12″ vinyl.

Critical reception

The album received generally positive reviews. It earned a collective score of 71 out of 100 from Metacritic.  Dave Simpson of The Guardian said that the album contains a "combination of masterful songwriting and lyrics that introduce dark edges" to a "more timeless than retro" sound.

Singles
 "True Romance (True No.9 Blues)" was released as the album's lead single and peaked at #142 on the UK Singles Chart.

Track listing

Personnel

Neil Brockbank - engineer
Nathaniel Facey - alto saxophone
Gwilym Gold - composer, keyboards, vocals, artwork
Dougal Lott - engineer
B.J. Ben Mason - engineer
Ben Moorhouse - bass, background vocals

Michael Mwenso - trombone
Robbie Nelson - engineer
Jay Phelps - trumpet
Daniel Rejmer - engineer
Graham Turner - photography
Rebecca Miller - photography
Colin Henderson - album cover design/illustration
Jack Watkins - web design

Source:

Chart
True Romance debuted and peaked at #96 on the UK Singles Chart and spent a total of 5 weeks on the chart.

References

2009 debut albums
XL Recordings albums